The Black Notebooks are a set of 34 (one missing) notebooks written by German philosopher Martin Heidegger (1889–1976) between October 1931 and 1970. Originally a set of small notebooks with black covers in which Heidegger jotted observations (some have said "sketches"). The size of the Black Notebooks are small about 5 1/4 ×  inches (Editors note. GA  95: page 353).  Approximately DIN format D5 (136 × 192 mm). Editors notes GA 97: page 525.

The Black Notebooks are thirty-four in number (one missing). Fifteen bear the title “Ponderings,” (Überlegungen); nine are called “Annotations” ( Anmerkungen); two “Four Notebooks” (Vier Hefte); two “Vigilae”; one “Notturno”; two “Intimations” (Winke); and four are named “Provisional Remarks” (Vorläufiges).  Two additional manuscripts have been mentioned in association with the Black Notebooks.  Those are “Megiston” (DLA Accession number 75.7419,5, before 1970) und “Grundworte” (Zum Sagen der Grundworte, DLA Accession number 75.7419,2).There are nine volumes published (see below); from GA 94, 1931-1928 until the final volume GA 102, 1963–1970. There are 34 (one missing) notebooks in this group and about 3384 published pages.  The Black Notebooks are published by Vittorio Klostermann in Heidegger's Gesamtausgabe (volumes GA 94–102).

Martin Heidegger defined the order of publication. His written Motto done a few months before his death as "Ways -- not works." (Wege — nicht Werke). GA 1:437.

According to the Klaus Held’s Marbach-Bericht Report (2020), Heidegger called the Black Notebooks, the “workshop notes” (“Werkstattaufzeichnungen”). One of the Heidegger's assistant, Friedrich-Wilhelm von Herrmann (1934-2022) said, these were on Heidegger's table next to his bed and he wrote in notebooks at night before going to bed.

Peter Trawny has edited the manuscripts and publishing them in the Heidegger's collected writings Gesamtausgabe (GA). The first manuscript was published in 2014. The first notebook, Anmerkungen I, now GA 97, was originally believed to be lost, but was found in the possession of Heidegger scholar Silvio Vietta, who had received it from his mother Dorothea Vietta (1913-1959). One notebook written in approximately 1930, sometimes called: “Winke Überlegungen (I)”, is still missing (GA 97 p. 521 note). As of the 2022, Martin Heidegger's Vorläufiges I–IV [ Preliminaries] was just published as GA 102; and according the Klostermann in their published notes (GA 102) this is the last of the Black Notebooks (total of 33 notebooks, published as nine volumes, 3384 pages).  According to Peter Trawny the editor in 2015 “In addition, two further booklets with the titles "Megiston" and "Grundworte” [basic words] were found in the DLA Marbach archives. Whether and how they belong to the "Black Books" has yet to be clarified”. (GA 97, page 521). Heidegger himself mentions Grundworte in the text (GA 99, page 64); and then Peter Trawny (2019) says in a footnote at the bottom of the page, “publication nothing has been decided yet” (GA 99, page 64). Published by Vittorio Klostermann.  From the publisher's notes about the last volume published GA 102, "Instead, a surprising preoccupation with "cybernetics," "industrial society," and even the "computer" emerges. The penultimate entry of the notebooks, written in a handwriting that is difficult to decipher, defines "thinking" as "an inaudible conversation with the escaped gods".  (entflohenen Göttern).  Note: volumes GA 94-96 have been translated into English (see below).

Controversy

When the first transcripts were published in 2014, they were edited by Peter Trawny.  The notebooks contain explicitly antisemitic content, reigniting the debate about Heidegger's Nazism and its relationship to his philosophical project. Critics of this claim have countered it by pointing to the sketchbook character of the Black Notebooks and the intention of the author for them to remain private and unpublished ruminations on the cultural and philosophical ideas received via time and place. Others have cited an antisemitism that does not qualify as racial, social, interpersonal or political, but rather exists only in a certain use of received concepts and German philosophical commentary up to his time.

Heidegger’s anti-Semitism, in no attempt to diminish the severity of anti-Semitic sentiment, purportedly did not originate from racial or biological prejudice. In fact, Heidegger even dismissed the legitimacy of race as a conceptual structure altogether, writing that “racial thinking is tied to the modern thinking of the human being as subject.” Heidegger used this conception, or lack thereof, of race as a function of modern thinking to discredit the German National Socialist notion of das Volk, or the people, for the same reasons—because it was a product of modern philosophy, namely Cartesian intersubjectivity. Nevertheless, Heidegger still held anti-Semitic views and justified them in his Black Notebooks by arguing that “by living according to the principle of race [the Jews] had themselves promoted the very reasoning by which they were now being attacked and so they had no right to complain when it was being used against them by the Germans promoting their own racial purity.” Regardless of whether or not race existed, Heidegger certainly felt that the Jewish people, by virtue of their distancing themselves from non-Jews and operating primarily within distinctly Jewish communities, had racialized themselves and thereby forfeited the right to protest their treatment under the Third Reich.

By rejecting race altogether, Heidegger’s understanding of the Jew existed outside of strictly racial or biological grounds, but found its footing in a metaphysical anti-Semitism, an anti-Semitism concerned with the idea of the Jew as a rootless, nomadic people lacking in both spirit and desire for agency, an alienated people posing a threat to the flourishing of the German people, das Volk.

 argues in "Heidegger's Black Notebooks and the Question of Anti-Semitism" that "In Heidegger's case, it is a type of anti-Semitism that could be qualified as "religious," "cultural," or "spiritual." In a letter to Hannah Arendt, in which he comments on the rumors about his anti-Semitism, it reads: "As to the rest, in matters related to the university I am as much an anti-Semite as I was ten years ago in Marburg. This anti-Semitism even found the support of Jacobstahl and Friedländer. This has nothing to do with personal relationships (for example, Husserl, Misch, Cassirer and others)."  When Heidegger speaks of "Judaization" (Verjudung), he does so from a given cultural context". Heidegger writes in his defense, "The rumors that are upsetting you are slanders that are perfect matches for other experiences I have endured over the last few years." Letters, 1925-1975 Hannah Arendt and Martin Heidegger; translated from the German by Andrew Shields. Letter #45, Winter 1932–33.” Page 52-53.  See the following interview with Silvio Vietta who knew Heidegger personally. Interview with Silvio Vietta in Deutschlandradio Kultur: Antisemitismus-Debatte um Martin Heidegger online here. January 23, 2014.

One example of Heidegger's remarks about anti-Semitism:

After reviewing GA 94, GA 95, GA 96, and GA 97. Martin Heidegger’s grandson Arnulf Heidegger (1969- ) said,

“It was never the intentions of my grandfather to propagate a doctrine, to construct a system, or to gather a body of followers. The effort of his thinking is much rather directed toward evoking essential thinking.” (ein wesentliches Fragen hervorzurufen”).  Forward to the following book, Martin Heidegger and the Truth About the Black Notebooks. Analecta Husserliana, vol 123. Springer, Cham. https://doi.org/10.1007/978-3-030-69496-8_2.

Published volumes.

Notes

External links 
 
 
Free Indexes:  Ferrer, Daniel. Fidel. (2016). Heidegger Schwarze Hefte (1931-1948): An Index https://archive.org/details/HeideggerSchwarzeBlackNotebooksIndex  Ferrer, D. F. (2016). Martin Heidegger Esoteric Writings: An Index https://archive.org/details/HeideggerEsotericIndex  Ferrer, D.F (2017). Heidegger Anmerkungen I-V (Schwarze Hefte 1942-1948): An Index https://archive.org/details/HeideggerGA97Index  Ferrer, D.F. (2016). Heidegger Überlegungen XII-XV (GA96): An Index. https://archive.org/details/HeideggerGA96Index 
Heidegger’s Black Notebooks and the Future of Theology 1st ed. 2017.  By Mårten Björk (Editor). (See Amazon). 
Reading Heidegger's Black Notebooks 1931-1941. By Ingo Farin (Editor), Jeff Malpas (Editor). (See Amazon). 
GA 94. Überlegungen II-VI (Schwarze Hefte 1931–1938). Translated by Richard Rojcewicz as Ponderings II–VI. (See Amazon). 
GA 95. Überlegungen VII-XI (Schwarze Hefte 1938/39). Translated by Richard Rojcewicz as Ponderings VII–XI. (See Amazon). 
GA 96.  Überlegungen XII-XV (Schwarze Hefte 1939–1941). Translated by Richard Rojcewicz as Ponderings XII–XV. (See Amazon). 
Deutsches Literaturarchiv Marbach, in the town of Marbach am Neckar Germany.  Also known as: DLA - German Literature Archive. [https://www.dla-marbach.de/] 
Heideggers Weg in die Moderne: Eine Verortung der »Schwarzen Hefte«.  273 Pages · 2016. By Hans-Helmuth Gander & Magnus Striet 
Martin Heidegger. Die Wahrheit über die Schwarzen Hefte 2017. 336 pages.  By Friedrich-Wilhelm von Herrmann und Francesco Alfieri. Forward by Arnulf Heidegger. 
Poesie der Vernichtung Literatur und Dichtung in Martin Heideggers Schwarzen Heften 2018.  Pages 259.  By Judith Werner.

20th-century philosophy
Books by Martin Heidegger
German non-fiction books
Unpublished books